Cedric Errol Fauntleroy (1891–1973) was an American pilot who in 1919 volunteered to serve in the Polish Air Force during the Polish-Soviet War of 1919–1921.

Born near Natchez, Mississippi, Fauntleroy served with Eddie Rickenbacker's 94th Fighter Squadron on the Western Front in World War I.

Recruited by his fellow veteran Merian C. Cooper in 1919, he became one of  the best pilots of the Polish 7th Air Escadrille, dubbed the Kościuszko Escadrille (the Kosciuszko Squadron, named for Polish and American national hero  Tadeusz Kościuszko). 
He was promoted to colonel and he received Poland's highest military decoration: the Virtuti Militari,  besides being awarded the Cross of Valour four times.

References
3.   Documentary television movie in Poland from 2005. Story of Merian Cooper, and the Americans who flew in defense of Poland in 1919/20. The Magnificent Seventeen. http://www.filmydokumentalne.eu/siedemnastu-wspanialych/
Janusz Cisek, Kosciuszko, We Are Here!: American Pilots of the Kosciuszko Squadron in Defense of Poland, 1919-1921, McFarland, 2002.

American World War I pilots
Polish Air Force officers
Recipients of the Silver Cross of the Virtuti Militari
Recipients of the Cross of Valour (Poland)
Polish people of the Polish–Soviet War
1891 births
1973 deaths